Kirk Merrington is a village in County Durham, in England. It is situated between the towns of Bishop Auckland and Ferryhill.
It is part of the Spennymoor township.

A notable resident is TV personality Scarlett Moffatt, best known for appearing in the Channel 4 programme Gogglebox.

External links

Villages in County Durham
Spennymoor